Japan competed at the 2019 Summer Universiade in Naples, Italy from 3 to 14 July 2019. This was the nation's 18th appearance at the Summer Universiade since making its debut at the 1985 edition. Japan finished the multi sport event at the top of the medal tally with 82 medals in 11 different sporting events.

Medal summary

Medal by sports

Medalists

References

External links 
 Official site of Naples 2019 

Nations at the 2019 Summer Universiade
Summer U
Japan at the Summer Universiade